Serge "Peter" Karlow was born circa 1921 in  New York, NY and died November 3, 2005 in Montclair, NJ

He was a CIA Technical Officer from 1947-1963 who was falsely accused of treason and forced to resign. The allegations against Karlow were made by KGB defector Anatoliy Golitsyn who described a CIA Officer of Slavic background who had bugged a building in Europe. Golitsyn said that he thought that the "Mole's" name began with a "K." In 1988, Director of Central Intelligence William Webster determined that the charges against Karlow had no merit. He was given an apology, medal and compensation.

Karlow served with distinction as a U.S. Navy Intelligence officer in World War II where he lost a leg in a mining explosion.

Karlow authored, "Targeted by the C.I.A.: An Intelligence Professional Speaks Out on the Scandal that Turned the C.I.A. Upside down."

References

Further reading
 Karlow, Serge. Targeted by the CIA: an intelligence professional speaks out on the scandal that turned the CIA upside down (2002), Turner.

External links
 

1920s births
2005 deaths
People of the Central Intelligence Agency